Zafar Iqbal Pasha Siddiqi (born 22 November 1947) is a former Pakistani cricketer and umpire. He stood in one One Day International (ODI) game in 2000.

See also
 List of One Day International cricket umpires

References

External links

1947 births
Living people
Pakistani One Day International cricket umpires
Cricketers from Rawalpindi
Pakistani cricketers
Rawalpindi cricketers